Fleenor is a surname. Notable people with the surname include:

 Jenee Fleenor, American musician
 Kenneth Raymond Fleenor (1929–2010), American Vietnam War veteran

See also
 Fleener (surname)